The Kuala Langat District is a district of Selangor, Malaysia. It is situated in the southwestern part of Selangor. It covers an area of 858 square kilometres, and had a population of 307,787 at the 2020 Census (exclude foreign). It is bordered by the districts of Klang and Petaling to the north and Sepang to the east. The Strait of Malacca forms its western border.

Among the major towns in Kuala Langat are Banting, Jugra, Teluk Datok, Morib and an island Carey Island.

Administrative divisions

Kuala Langat District is divided into 7 mukims, which are:
 Bandar
 Batu
 Jugra
 Kelanang
 Morib
 Tanjung 12
 Teluk Panglima Garang

Demographics

Land use 
Kuala Langat is predominantly an agricultural district, with the main crop being oil-palm. In addition, Kuala Langat has several forest reserves, including the Kuala Langat North Forest Reserve and the Kuala Langat South Forest Reserve, both of which are important for the conservation of flora and fauna.

Tourist attractions
Kuala Langat is famous for its agricultural produce, industries that recycle scrap metal, home stay programmes for tourists and for its National Space Centre in Kanchong Darat. Local farmers transform scrap metal from cars, electronics and other household appliances into large 12 meter transformers.

 Malaysia Paragliding Flight Park
 Sentoria Morib Resort City
 Amverton Cove Golf & Island Resort

Infrastructure
Putrajaya and the Kuala Lumpur International Airport (KLIA), linked by new highways, have become the catalyst for Kuala Langat’s development. Road networks and infrastructure in the district are good, making it viable for manufacturers to transport their finished goods on freight trucks to Kuala Lumpur, KLIA and Port Klang.

Bandar Saujana Putra, located in the far-north of the district, was established in 2003 by LBS Bina Berhad and is located near Putra Heights, UEP Subang Jaya (USJ) and Puchong, as well as Cyberjaya, Putrajaya, and Teluk Panglima Garang.

The Teluk Panglima Garang Free Trade Zone, industries manufacturing electronic components and car parts have created many job opportunities for locals.

Morib is being moulded into an education hub and that plans were afoot to set up a few educational institutions in Jugra. Currently, there is the Kuala Langat Community College and Industrial Training Institute. Other institutions being built are a matriculation college, a polytechnic and a MARA skills training institute.

Kota Kemuning is a township located in the constituency of Kota Raja developed by Hicom-Gamuda Development Sdn Bhd in 1994 and is renowned as one of the Klang Valley’s finest residences with its healthy and harmonious living environment.

Bandar Rimbayu dubbed as "The Township Nature Perfected" is a 1,879-acre premier township situated adjacent to Kota Kemuning is a development that consists of a mixed development of residential, commercial, recreational and parkland components. The township is spread over 4 precincts: Flora, Fauna, Bayu and Commercial Hub. Surrounded by 4 major highways to Kuala Lumpur City Centre, Subang, Petaling Jaya, Damansara, Puchong, Shah Alam and Klang Valley gives the township excellent connectivity.

Federal Parliament and State Assembly Seats

List of Kuala Langat district representatives in the Federal Parliament (Dewan Rakyat) 

List of Kuala Langat district representatives in the State Legislative Assembly (Dewan Undangan Negeri)

See also
 Districts of Malaysia

References